The Sarukhanids or Sarukhanid dynasty (Modern Turkish: Saruhanoğulları, Saruhanoğulları Beyliği), also known as the Principality of Saruhan and Beylik of Saruhan (Saruhan Beyliği), was one of the Anatolian beyliks, centered in Manisa.

It was one of the frontier principalities established by Oghuz Turkish clans after the decline of the Anatolian Seljuk Sultanate. It was founded by the tribal chief Saruhan about 1300 and lasted for a first time until 1390, when Bayezid I overran the region and finally until 1412, when the Ottoman Sultan Mehmed I killed Hızır, the last Saruhan ruler, and absorbed the Beylik into the Ottoman Empire as a province.

History
The founder of the beylik, Sarukhan Bey, began his military career as an emir of the Germiyanids. Sometime at the beginning of the 14th century, he seized territories for himself in the Gediz River (Hermus under its previous Byzantine rulers) valley and founded a dynasty that started to rule the region from its base in Manisa. Its principal towns included Menemen, Gördes, Demirci, Nif, and Kasaba.

Legacies
The dynasty's period as a regional power is largely limited to the long reign of its founder, Sarukhan Bey (d. 1346), under whom the principality became a naval power in the Aegean Sea, and regularly battled with the fleets of the Republic of Genoa and the Dukes of Naxos.

The most enduring monument of the Sarukhan dynasty is the Great Mosque at Manisa. Constructed in 1374 by İshak Bey, the mosque has a prayer hall covered by a dome 14m in diameter. Attached to the prayer hall is an innovative, semi-covered forecourt. The building likely served as inspiration for the Üç Şerefeli Mosque, constructed some sixty years later by the Ottoman sultan Murad II.

The region roughly corresponding to the area of extension of Sarukhan dynasty's administration became an Ottoman sub-province (sanjak) under the continued name of Sarukhan until the early years of the Republic of Turkey.

List of rulers
Saruhan Bey (1313–1346)
Fahrüddin İlyas Bey (1346–1362)
Muzafferüddin İshak Bey (1362–1388)	
Hızırşah (1362–1390)	

Under Ottoman rule (1390–1402):
Orhan Bey (1402–1404)	
Hızırşah Bey (1404–1410)	
Orhan Bey (1410–1412)

See also
 Anatolian beyliks

References

Sources

 

 
Anatolian beyliks
History of Manisa
History of Manisa Province
States and territories established in the 1300s
States and territories disestablished in the 1410s